Béatrice Knopf-Basson (born 29 June 1958 in Mulhouse) is a French sprint canoer who competed in the 1980s. Competing in three Summer Olympics, she earned her best finish of fifth in the K-1 500 m event at Los Angeles in 1984.

References
 Sports-Reference.com profile

1958 births
Canoeists at the 1980 Summer Olympics
Canoeists at the 1984 Summer Olympics
Canoeists at the 1988 Summer Olympics
French female canoeists
Living people
Olympic canoeists of France
Sportspeople from Mulhouse